KRLS may refer to:

 KRLS (FM), a radio station (92.1 FM) licensed to serve Knoxville, Iowa, United States
 Kinchafoonee Regional Library System